Samuel David Camillo Olivetti known just as Camillo  (August 13, 1868 – December 1943) was an Italian electrical engineer and founder of Olivetti & Co., SpA., the Italian manufacturer of computers, printers and other business machines. The company was later run by his son Adriano.

Biography 
He was born in 1868 in a bourgeois Jewish family in Ivrea, Piedmont. His name was Samuel David Camillo Olivetti. His father, Salvador Benedetto, was a textile trader and his mother, Elvira Sacerdoti, that was from Modena, was bankers' daughter. From his father, Camillo Olivetti received the entrepreneurial style and the love for the progress,  while from his mother the love for languages (Elvira spoke four languages). His cousin was the painter Raffaele Pontremoli. when Camillo was one years old, his father died. His mother looked after him, who was sent to the boarding school of «Calchi Taeggi» in Milan.
At the end of high school, he enrolled at the Royal Italian Industrial Museum (later Politecnico di Torino from 1906) and at the Technical Application School, where he attended electrotechnics courses held by Galileo Ferraris. He graduated on the 31st December 1891 in industrial engineering, Camillo needed to improve his English and, on the other, to gain useful work experience. He stayed over a year in London where he worked in an industry that produced measuring instruments for electrical quantities, also doing the mechanic.
Upon his return to Turin, he became Ferraris's assistant. In 1893 he accompanied his teacher to United States of America, who had been invited to lecture at the International Congress of Electrotechnics in Chicago. Olivetti acted as his interpreter. Together they visited the Thomas A. Edison laboratories at Llewellyn Park, New Jersey, where they met the brilliant American inventor in person. After this meeting, in 1893, Camillo wrote to his brother-in-law Carlo from Chicago:

Camillo continued the journey from Chicago to San Francisco alone, carefully writing down the things he was discovering about the United States of America. His correspondence from the United States was published in 1968 with the title of  American Letters : if the English industrial situation had already struck him, he found the American reality far superior, not only from an industrial point of view but also from a social point of view. A few months in Palo Alto began to know better US universities. As assistant electrotechnical at Stanford University (November 1893 - April 1894), Olivetti was able to experiment in the laboratory the potential and the different applications of the use of electricity. The United States will always represent for Olivetti the frontier of economic modernity, the model to refer to in the path of affirmation of its industrial project in Italy: the vivid memory of the collection of American letters, published after his death in Biella in December 1943.

See also
 Adriano Olivetti

References and notes

External links

1868 births
1943 deaths
People from Ivrea
20th-century Italian Jews
Electronics engineers
Engineers from Turin
Italian industrialists
Olivetti people
19th-century Italian businesspeople
20th-century Italian businesspeople
19th-century Italian Jews